James Joyce Pipe (1 March 1909 – 1987) was an English footballer who played as a left back for Millwall in the Football League making 196 appearances. He also played for Grays Thurrock United.

References

External links
RootsWeb profile

1909 births
1987 deaths
Footballers from Blackheath, London
English footballers
Association football fullbacks
Grays Thurrock United F.C. players
Millwall F.C. players
English Football League players